Noida Film City is a complex of studios and structures for filming located in Noida, India. It houses the Asian Academy of Film & Television and Marwah Films & Video Studios along with prominent news channels from India. It is located in Sector 16-A Noida, India. It was founded in 1988 by Sandeep Marwah, an Indian film producer, founder and chairperson of AAFT. It has been the location for many Bollywood and Indian films.

Features
It offers about 100 acres of complex (75 acres outdoor, 25 acres indoor), 16 studios, 350 Channels are being broadcast and about employing about  150,000 people.

Owing to its proximity to Doordarshan (the Prasar Bharati transmission headquarters in New Delhi) and a large number of private broadcasting and transmitting stations that have moved to the National Capital Region, the Film City has become a first choice for shooting television serials, news and other entertainment-cum-education programs.

The Film City is a gateway to Noida's twin brother, Greater Noida, which has developed as an ultra-modern industrial township, evincing interest from large globally established multinational corporations and other corporate houses promising international standards of living. Large-scale activity in all these studios, outdoor locales provided by the Film City, and the twin cities of Noida and Greater Noida have put it on the world map of filmmaking.

For the wide range of news, views, and current affairs programs being shot there, the Film City continues to attract a host of politicians, bureaucrats, and celebrities from practically every walk of life, making it one of the most sought-after centers of VIP visits. Foreign delegations and filmmakers from abroad are drawn to the Film City for their interest in studying its success story and for exploring the possibilities of collaborative joint ventures and culture exchange programs with the like-minded Indian media houses there.

It offers easy permitting that can be acquired within 48 hours, which is much faster than locations in Delhi and also has low rates and hence it has become a favorite of many film producers.

Corporate offices
Corporate office of companies and television channels in the Film City include:
 News World India
 Indian School of Communicative Arts (ISCA- School of Media Studies) INOX TOWERS
 Jubilant Life Sciences Ltd. / Jubilant Industries Ltd.
 NTPC Limited (Training & Development Centre)
 HPCL-Mittal Energy Limited
 Bharat Heavy Electricals Limited (BHEL) (Training & Development Centre)
 Freescale Semiconductor India Pvt. Ltd.
 Network 18
 Indian Express (Express Towers)
 NDTV (upcoming)
 TV Today Network of India Today Group
 Agency One Media Private Limited (INOX TOWERS) (Coming up)
 Moving Pictures Ltd.
 Marwah Studios
 Eagle Films
 T-Series
 Bag Films
 BKP Media Ltd. / Azad Channel
 Pragya Channel
 Mahuaa News and Entertainment
 Times Now & ET Now (Times Center) of The Times Group
 Dish TV India Ltd.
 GAIL (India) Ltd Training Institute
 Zee Media Corporation Ltd.
 Mathews Network
 Dorling Kindersley Publishing
 Dainik Bhaskar Group

See also
 Film City
 Ramoji Film City
 Cinema of India
 Film and Television Institute of India
 State Institute of Film and Television
 Satyajit Ray Film and Television Institute

References

External links
 Marwah Studio (official website)
 AAFT India: Film Schools, Acting Schools, Film Academy, Noida Film City

Film schools in India
Television organisations in India
Film production companies of Uttar Pradesh
Indian film studios
1988 establishments in Uttar Pradesh
Economy of Noida